Balaka is a district in the Southern Region of Malawi. The capital is Balaka. The district covers an area of 2,193 km.² and has a population of over 310,000.  The district's population is increasing at a rate of 2.3% per annum.  Major attractions in Balaka District include the 1,850Ha estate Toleza Agricultural Enterprises, St. Louis Montfort Catholic Church, the Andiamo Vocational Complex and the Chifundo Artisans' Network.

In this district is the town of Nkaya, an important urban center that serves as the junction point of the country's road-rail systems.

Demographics
At the time of the 2018 Census of Malawi, the distribution of the population of Balaka District by ethnic group was as follows:
 37.2% Yao
 25.2% Lomwe
 24.2% Ngoni
 5.0% Chewa
 2.8% Nyanja
 2.4% Sena
 2.1% Mang'anja
 0.6% Tumbuka
 0.2% Tonga
 0.1% Nkhonde
 0.0% Lambya
 0.0% Sukwa
 0.3% Others

Government and administrative divisions

There are four National Assembly constituencies in Balaka:

 Balaka - Central East
 Balaka - North
 Balaka - South
 Balaka - West

References

External links
 Andiamo Vocational Complex
 Chifundo Artisans' Network

Districts of Malawi
Districts in Southern Region, Malawi